Zheleznodorozhnaya Kazarma 24 km is a rural locality (a station) in Zlatopolinsky Selsoviet, Kulundinsky District, Altai Krai, Russia. The population was 633 as of 2013. There are 6 streets.

References 

Rural localities in Kulundinsky District